Kobes is a surname. Notable people with the surname include:

Jonathan A. Kobes (born 1974), American judge
Tomáš Kobes (born 1978), Czech slalom canoeist

See also
Kobe (surname)